Han Jae-suk (born Han Sang-woo on August 12, 1973) is a South Korean actor. He has starred in several television series, notably All About Eve (2000), Four Sisters (2001), Glass Slippers (2002), The Great Ambition (Daemang, 2002), Women of the Sun (2008), and The Great Merchant (2010). Han has also ventured into the Chinese-language market, getting cast opposite Ruby Lin in Amor de Tarapaca (2004) and Cecilia Cheung in Speed Angels (2011).

Personal life
Han began dating actress Park Sol-mi after they worked together on The Great Merchant in 2010. They wed at Aston House, Sheraton Grande Walkerhill Hotel in Seoul on April 21, 2013. Park's agency announced in September 2013 that the couple is expecting their first child.
On March 23, 2014 she gave birth to their daughter.

Controversy

Draft-dodging scandal investigation 
In 2004 Han became involved in a draft-dodging scandal after investigations revealed that he and fellow actors Song Seung-heon and Jang Hyuk paid a broker  to help them fail the medical exam and avoid mandatory military service. Amid widespread public condemnation, their exemptions were reversed and they enlisted that year, then were eventually discharged in 2006.

Filmography

Television series

Film

Awards and nominations

References

External links

Han Jae-suk at Star Brothers Entertainment

1973 births
Living people
20th-century South Korean male actors
21st-century South Korean male actors
IHQ (company) artists
South Korean male television actors
South Korean male film actors
South Korean male models
Draft evaders